Patriarch Joseph VI may refer to:

 Joseph Estephan, Maronite Patriarch of Antioch in 1766–1793
 Joseph VI Audo, Patriarch of the Chaldean Catholic Church in 1847–1878